"Easy Lover" is a song by English singer Ellie Goulding featuring American rapper Big Sean, released on 15 July 2022 through Polydor Records as the lead single from her upcoming fifth studio album Higher Than Heaven. It was written by Goulding, Sean, Greg Kurstin and Julia Michaels, and produced by Kurstin.

Background 
In January 2022, Goulding hinted at releasing new music in an Instagram post, while expressing concerns about having to manage her mental wellbeing. In July 2022, Goulding sent an email to her fans saying "that the song was a long time coming and that it had had many lives". In an interview with Billboard, she detailed the process behind working with Kurstin and Michaels for the song, saying: "I think one of us was dealing with a known f–kboy at the time, but we ended up with a song about going back to the same person who’s hurt you and you think you can change them. We always say we can change someone, and we can’t."

Regarding the collaboration process with Big Sean on the record, she added: "We’ve stayed in touch for years because he sampled me a couple of times, I always feel like there’s something pretty special in someone who appreciates me that early on as an artist, so I’ve stayed in touch with everyone from that era, in particular him because I think’s he’s consistently been a brilliant artist. At some point we were going to do a collab, and it just happened to be this song."

A solo version of the song was later released on 26 August 2022.

Music video 
The music video, directed by Sophia Ray, was shot in a school in Bulgaria. Goulding plays several characters, including a teacher and an androgynous rocker, to take on an otherworldly creature. Sean makes an appearance in a scene as Goulding plays a teacher who is taking class photos.

In an interview with Rolling Stone UK, Goulding stated: "I was really nervous that the video would just end up being a representation of the song. But I wanted it to be something else. I wanted it to be a bit trippy, like we’re living in some kind of parallel universe, or we’re all in some kind of simulation, like a video game." She added that she wanted to allude to characters that might return later in the campaign.

Reception 
"Easy Lover" has received generally positive reviews from critics. Alex Gonzalez from Uproxx praised Sean's verse, describing it as "clever wordplay", and Mike DeWald from RIFF Magazine enthused about an "anthemic feeling" in the song.

Track listing 
Digital download / streaming
"Easy Lover" (featuring Big Sean) – 3:35

Digital download / streaming – Four Tet Remix
"Easy Lover" (Four Tet Remix) – 4:11

Digital download / streaming – Solo Version
"Easy Lover" (Solo Version) – 3:25

Digital download / streaming – Jax Jones Remix
"Easy Lover" (Jax Jones Remix) – 2:00

Digital download / streaming – The Remixes
"Easy Lover" (featuring Big Sean; Navos Remix) – 2:44
"Easy Lover" (Russ Chimes Remix) – 3:35
"Easy Lover" (featuring Big Sean; Colbath Remix) – 3:35

Credits and personnel 
Credits adapted from Tidal.

 Ellie Goulding – lead vocals, songwriter, composer, lyricist
 Big Sean – lead vocals, songwriter, composer, lyricist
 Greg Kurstin – producer, songwriter, composer, lyricist, bass, drums, electric guitar, keyboards, percussion, synthesizer
 Julia Michaels – composer, songwriter, lyricist
 Bryce Bordone – assistant mixing engineer
 Joe Kearns – vocal engineer
 Randy Merrill – mastering engineer
 Tom Kahre – engineer
 Matt Tuggle – engineer
 Alex Pasco – engineer
 Julian Burg – engineer
 Serban Ghenea – mixing

Charts

Release history

References 

2022 songs
2022 singles
Big Sean songs
Ellie Goulding songs
Songs written by Ellie Goulding
Songs written by Big Sean
Songs written by Greg Kurstin
Songs written by Julia Michaels
Song recordings produced by Greg Kurstin
Music videos shot in Bulgaria
Polydor Records singles